David A. Edwards (born April 6, 1961) is an American biomedical engineer, and the founder of Sensory Cloud. He was the Gordon McKay Professor of the Practice of Biomedical Engineering at Harvard University.
 
Edwards designs inhalable medicines, vaccines and victuals.

In 2001, Edwards was elected a member of the National Academy of Engineering for transfer of scientific principles of engineering to industry, including invention and commercial development of a novel, generic aerosol drug-delivery system.

Education
Edwards studied chemical engineering, receiving a BS from Michigan Technological University in the field in 1983, and a PhD in 1987 from the Illinois Institute of Technology.

Career
Between 1987 and 1995, Edwards held a postdoctoral and lectureship at the Technion in Israel and the Massachusetts Institute of Technology. While at MIT, Robert Langer, a professor at MIT, encouraged Edwards to develop an efficient way for inhalers to deliver medicine to the lungs. Edwards joined the Pennsylvania State University faculty as an Associate Professor of Chemical Engineering in 1995, where he continued to research ways to make medicine inhalable. In 1997,  Science published his study on a new type of inhalable aerosol that efficiently delivered drugs to the lungs. Edwards left academia in 1998 when he and Langer founded Advanced Inhalation Research (AIR); the startup was purchased a year later by Alkermes for $114 million. He returned to academia in 2002, joining the Harvard faculty.

Edwards' scientific work in biomedical engineering concerns the research and development of drug delivery platforms for treating infectious diseases in the developing world. He was a founder of Advanced Inhalation Research, now part of Alkermes, Inc., of Pulmatrix, and of Medicine in Need, an international non-governmental organization aimed at developing new drugs and vaccines for diseases of poverty, such as tuberculosis.

In 2020, Edwards founded the company Sensory Cloud. Sensory Cloud released a nasal inhalable product intended to reduce infected air droplets from viruses like SARS-CoV-2, a strain of coronavirus known to cause COVID-19. 

In a February 2021 study in the Proceedings of the National Academy of Sciences of the United States of America, Edwards and his colleagues posited that "exhaled aerosol increases with COVID-19 infection, age, and obesity".

Le Laboratoire 
In 2007, Edwards opened "Le Lab" as a space for artists, designers, scientists, and the general public to meet for exhibitions, performances, and discussions in Paris, and then he moved it to 650 East Kendall Street in the Kendall Square area of Cambridge, Massachusetts in 2014. Major exhibitions by artists such as Mark Dion and artist/engineer Chuck Hoberman were shown, as well as innovations developed by Edwards, his associates, and his students. Some of his food-related inventions were available for purchase at Cafe ArtScience, an innovative restaurant associated with Le Laboratoire Cambridge. In December 2019, it was announced that Cafe ArtScience was closing  after 5 years of operation, and would be replaced by a new restaurant, called "Senses".

Personal life
Edwards, his wife and three children have lived alternately in Boston and Paris.

Publications

References

External links
Edwards' web site

Living people
American biomedical engineers
Michigan Technological University alumni
Illinois Institute of Technology alumni
MIT School of Engineering faculty
Pennsylvania State University faculty
John A. Paulson School of Engineering and Applied Sciences faculty
1961 births